BBC Earth is a documentary subscription television channel featuring premium factual programming. The channel is wholly owned and operated by BBC Studios. Originally set to roll out internationally in 2014, it was later announced that it would launch in 2015, starting in Poland.

History
In October 2013, the BBC announced that in 2014 it would rollout 3 new brands – BBC Earth, BBC First, and BBC Brit, with BBC Earth to be dedicated to premium factual programming. It was later announced that the channel would air series such as Frozen Planet and Wonders of the Universe. In addition, roughly 30 hours of new content would be ordered for the channel in its first year. The channel is set to replace BBC Knowledge; however, if the existing channel is successful in certain markets, it may continue to operate.

International roll-out

Poland
BBC Earth launched in Poland on 1 February 2015, replacing BBC Knowledge.

Nordic countries
BBC Earth replaced BBC Knowledge in Denmark, Norway, Sweden, Finland and Iceland on 13 April 2015. It will be replaced by BBC Nordic on 17 April 2023.

Hungary
BBC Earth replaced BBC Knowledge on 14 April 2015.

Romania
On 14 April 2015, BBC Earth was launched in Romania, replacing BBC Knowledge.

Turkey
BBC Earth launched in Turkey, replacing BBC Knowledge on 14 April 2015.

Latin America
BBC Earth launched in the Latin American countries of Argentina, Brazil, Chile, Colombia, Costa Rica, Dominican Republic, Ecuador, El Salvador, Guatemala, Honduras, Mexico, Nicaragua, Panama, Paraguay, Peru, Uruguay and Venezuela on 1 September 2015, replacing BBC HD. On 13 April 2017, the channel ceased its transmissions, along with BBC Entertainment and CBeebies.

South Africa
The channel launched in South Africa on the DStv (satellite) platform replacing BBC Knowledge on 1 September 2015.

Asia
In Asia, BBC Earth launched in Cambodia, Hong Kong, Indonesia, Malaysia, Mongolia, Singapore, South Korea, Taiwan, Thailand and Vietnam on 3 October 2015, replacing BBC Knowledge. In the Philippines, it was launched on 1 April 2017 along with BBC World News. On 12 September 2017, it was announced to be launch via Laosat DTH in Laos. In Myanmar, the channel was available via Sky Net and CANAL+.

On September 14, 2021, BBC Earth HD, along with BBC Lifestyle HD, returned to Malaysian satellite TV service Astro.

Serbia

In Serbia, BBC Earth was launched on 28 December 2015 replacing BBC Entertainment.

Eastern Europe
BBC Earth launched in Eastern European countries on 1 January 2016, replacing BBC Entertainment.

Greece
In Greece, the channel was launched on Cosmote TV on 1 October 2017.

Middle East & North Africa (MENA)
BBC Earth launched in Middle East & North Africa through the beIN DTH and stc tv service effective on 5 April 2018.

India

BBC has entered into a joint venture with Multi Screen Media to launch the channel in India, branded as Sony BBC Earth. It was launched on 6 March 2017, following regulatory approval of the joint venture. Kareena Kapoor is the ambassador for this channel.

Canada 

On 6 December 2016, BBC Worldwide and Canadian media company Blue Ant Media announced plans to launch a Canadian version of BBC Earth. The channel launched on 24 January 2017 and on 18 February 2017 hosted the Canadian premiere of Planet Earth II, on the same date as the United States, where it also aired on BBC America. BBC Earth replaced Blue Ant Media's radX. Due to foreign ownership restrictions by the Canadian Radio-television and Telecommunications Commission, the channel is fully owned by Blue Ant Media, with the BBC Earth brand and programming licensed from BBC Worldwide.

New Zealand

BBC Earth launched on Sky on 22 October 2018 in New Zealand,  replacing BBC Knowledge.

Australia
BBC Earth launched on Foxtel and Fetch TV in Australia on 10 October 2019, replacing BBC Knowledge.

United States 
In the United States, BBC Earth does not have a channel in the country, but airs all BBC Earth programs on BBC America, and channels owned by Warner Bros. Discovery, while PBS also does the same thing, but also including partnerships in Nature, Nova, and more.

Programming blocks 
There are BBC Earth programming blocks on the following channels:
 ProSieben Maxx (Germany; since 3 September 2013).
 #0, previously Canal+ (Spain; since June 2015).
 Eén (Flanders; since Autumn 2015).
 WOWOW (Japan; since 2010)

References

External links
 BBC Earth Official Website
 BBC Earth at Blue Ant Media

International BBC television channels
Television channels and stations established in 2015
Television channels in Poland
Pan-Nordic television channels
Television networks in Hungary
Television stations in Romania
Television stations in Turkey
Television stations in South Africa
2015 establishments in the United Kingdom
Television channels in North Macedonia
Television networks in Australia
English-language television stations in Australia
BBC Worldwide